Afzal Khan may refer to:

Afzal Khan (general) (died 1659), Bijapuri general
Afzal Khan (actor) (born 1966), Pakistani actor
Afzal Khan Shirazi, Mughal administrator and prime minister
Mir Afzal Khan, former Pakistani politician
Afzal Khan Lala (1926–2015), Pashtun nationalist
Afzal Khan (British politician) (born 1958), UK Member of Parliament and former Member of the European Parliament
Afzal Ahmed Khan, Indian film director and producer
Afzal Rahman Khan (1921–2005), Pakistan Navy admiral and politician
Afzal Khan Khattak, Pashtun chief of the Khattak tribe
Afzal Kahn (automotive designer) (born 1964), British automotive designer
Afzal H. Khan, Bangladesh politician